Chalkwell is a suburb of the city of Southend-on-Sea, in the City of Southend-on-Sea, in the ceremonial county of Essex, England. It faces the Thames Estuary and is in traditional terms still part of Westcliff-on-Sea.

History 
The Crow Stone (less often called London Stone) stands high on a plinth on the mud on the Thames Estuary foreshore facing the south end of Chalkwell Avenue. It was erected in 1837 and replaced a smaller stone, dating from 1755. The older stone was taken to Priory Park in Southend where it remains today. The line, known as the Yantlet Line, between the Crow Stone and the London Stone, Yantlet Creek, almost due south on the other shore of the Thames is the eastern limit of the jurisdiction of the Port of London Authority (PLA). This is relevant to local byelaws such as for a locally qualified maritime pilot into and out of port of larger vessels and the PLA's authority to police navigation (which also reserves the right to go in hot pursuit). It was designated as a Grade II listed building in July 2021. This is the second stone erected on the Chalkwell foreshore, the original from 1755 having been moved to Priory Park.

Amenities
In 2009, an open water swimming club, the "Chalkwell Redcaps" was established and has quickly grown to be one of the UK's largest. The Crow Stone is often the club's assembly point.

Chalkwell has a station, a few metres from the beach, with regular direct trains to London. Chalkwell Park has hosted Essex County Cricket Club matches and is the home ground for two local cricket clubs.

Demography 

At the 2001 UK census, the Chalkwell electoral ward had a population of 9,207, increasing to 10,045 at the 2011 Census. The ethnicity was 94.6% White, 1.2% Mixed, 2.7% Asian, 1.1% Black and 0.4% Other. The place of birth of residents was 91.1% United Kingdom, 1.3% Republic of Ireland, 1.6% other Western European countries and 6.0% elsewhere. Religion was recorded as 63.4% Christian, 0.3% Buddhist, 0.8% Hindu, 0% Sikh, 6.7% Jewish, and 2% Muslim. 17.6% were recorded as having no religion, 0.5% had an alternative religion and 8.7% did not state any religion.

The economic activity of residents aged 16 to 74 was 41.5% in full-time employment, 10.2% in part-time employment, 11.4% self-employed, 4.2% unemployed, 2.1% students with jobs, 3.6% students without jobs, 11.2% retired, 6.7% looking after home or family, 5.9% permanently sick or disabled and 3.2% economically inactive for other reasons.

The industry of employment of residents was 13.2% retail, 8.8% manufacturing, 5% construction, 15.8% real estate, 11.3% health and social work, 9.3% education, 6% transport and communications, 5.4% public administration, 4.2% hotels and restaurants, 14.3% finance, 0.3% agriculture and 6.4% other. Compared with national figures, the ward had a relatively high proportion of workers in finance and education. Of the ward's residents aged 16–74, 21.9% had a higher education qualification or the equivalent, compared with 19.9% nationwide. According to Office for National Statistics estimates, during the period of April 2004 to March 2005 the average gross weekly income of households was £670, compared with an average of £650 in South East England.

References and footnotes

External links
 Images on geograph
 The PLA page of thames.me.uk
 Chalkwell Park – The Park
 Chalkwell Hall – Metal Culture

Populated coastal places in Essex
Beaches of Essex
Southend-on-Sea (district)